Boccaccio (also known as The Nights of Boccaccio) is a 1972 Italian comedy film written and directed by Bruno Corbucci. It is loosely based on the Giovanni Boccaccio's novel Decameron, and it is part of a series of derivative comedies based on the success of Pier Paolo Pasolini's The Decameron (1971).

Cast 

Alighiero Noschese: Lambertuccio da Cecina 
Enrico Montesano: Buonamico di Cristofano aka Buffalmacco 
Mario Carotenuto: Judge Nicola 
Sylva Koscina: Fiammetta
Isabella Biagini: Ambruogia
Raymond Bussières: Cagastraccio
Bernard Blier: dottor Mazzeo
Pia Giancaro: Monna Lisa
Paola Tedesco : Lidia
Andrea Fabbricatore: Calandrino
Pascale Petit: Giletta di Narbona
María Baxa: Tebalda
Rosita Pisano: Mannocchia 
Sandro Dori: Nicostrato
Lino Banfi:  Father Ignazio da Canosa
Pippo Franco: Bruno degli Olivieri
Toni Ucci: Pietro da Vinciolo
Franca Dominici: Perdicca
Luisa Dominici: Belcolore
Guido Celano: Messer Anselmo
Andrea Aureli: Maso
Hélène Chanel: Princess of Civignì
Ignazio Leone: Il Bargello
Antonia Santilli: donna nella tinozza
Nello Pazzafini: Marito della donna nella tinozza
Gastone Pescucci: Giovanni Cioppolo
Mimmo Poli: Spettatore grasso
Luca Sportelli: Loderinghi

References

External links

1972 films
Films based on works by Giovanni Boccaccio
Films directed by Bruno Corbucci
Films scored by Carlo Rustichelli
1972 comedy films
The Decameron
Italian comedy films
Films set in the 14th century
1970s Italian-language films
1970s Italian films